SysAid Technologies (formerly Ilient) is an international company founded in 2002 that develops and provides IT Service Management software. SysAid Technologies is a privately owned company, founded by Israel Lifshitz (also founder of NUBO Software).

Company overview
Corporate headquarters are located in Airport City, Israel, near Tel Aviv. In June 2010, the company opened an additional office in Sydney, Australia. In May 2012, it opened another office in Brazil, South America. SysAid's products are now used in more than 100,000 organizations worldwide in numerous industries, including: healthcare, retail, education, financial services, manufacturing, aviation, and food/beverages.

SysAid is a software system for IT professionals, however SysAid has also been deployed and used by other industry professionals, such as municipalities and insurance companies.

References

See also 
Comparison of issue tracking systems
Comparison of help desk issue tracking software

Software companies of Israel
Privately held companies of Israel
Business software
Help desk software
Bug and issue tracking software